The Tampa Bay Automobile Museum, located in Pinellas Park, Florida in the Tampa Bay Area, displays historic automobiles from the 20th century. All of the vehicles displayed are from the collection of Alain Cerf, a French entrepreneur.

The collection is focused on cars which demonstrate special creativity and imagination in their history and engineering. This includes rare early front-wheel drive cars, Tatra rear engine cars, rear-engine Mercedes-Benz, Citroën cars, the only surviving car by French engineer Émile Claveau, and a unique working full-scale replica of the first self-propelled mechanical vehicle, the fardier of Nicolas-Joseph Cugnot.

Gallery

See also
List of automobile museums
List of transport museums

References

Automobile museums in Florida
Museums in Pinellas County, Florida
Tampa Bay area